KMJK (107.3 FM) is an urban contemporary radio station serving the Kansas City metropolitan area. Licensed to North Kansas City, Missouri, the Cumulus Media, Inc. outlet operates at 107.3 MHz with an ERP of 100 kW from a transmitter in Napoleon, Missouri. KMJK's studios are located in Overland Park, Kansas.

KMJK's main competitor is long-standing heritage station KPRS.

KMJK is the Kansas City affiliate for the D.L. Hughley Show.

History

Early years
What is now KMJK started broadcasting on September 11, 1969 at 106.3 FM as KLEX-FM, as the station's city of license was Lexington, Missouri and a transmitter just north of Odessa, Missouri. The format was country music. The station's call letters changed to KBEK-FM in 1976, and relocated to 107.3 in 1981 with a class C signal. The station was locally owned by Lexington Broadcasters until being sold in September 1989. In 1984, the station changed formats to satellite-fed Adult contemporary as KCAC. On December 1, 1988, the station changed formats back to country and changed call letters to KCFM. The station was acquired by Meyer Communications in September 1989.

Top 40 as KXXR/KISF
KCFM swapped formats and frequencies with Capitol Broadcasting's KXXR (a Top 40 station at 106.5 FM, now WDAF-FM) on February 16, 1992 at Midnight. The first song played after the swap was "I'm Too Sexy" by Right Said Fred. Meyer continued to own the station, while being operated by Capitol via an LMA. The KXXR call letters would officially move to 107.3 FM on March 13, 1992 (106.5, meanwhile, adopted the KKCJ call letters four days earlier). US Radio, led by Philadelphia attorney Ragan Henry who owned other radio stations across the country, would buy the station in October 1992.

On February 4, 1993, after 24 hours of stunting with a loop of "Kiss" by Prince, the station changed call letters and monikers to KISF, "Kiss 107.3". After KBEQ's unannounced flip to Country later that month, KISF was the only Top 40 station in the market until KMXV flipped from AC to Top 40 in March 1994. KMXV also had a signal that covered the entire Kansas City metro. Despite the station's coverage area being mainly east of Kansas City, KISF still received decent ratings.

Modern rock era
During the mid-1990s, alternative rock was becoming the popular sound of the decade, as the Top 40 format was entering a period of decline. Deciding to follow the trend, and to compete against KLZR, KISF started evolving towards modern rock with a lean on 1980s new wave in late 1994, with the shift complete by January 1995, including a slight name change to "107.3 Kiss FM" (and would later rebrand as simply "107.3"). The station initially had trouble gaining an audience, largely because the station hung on to remnants of its former format, including imaging and presentation. In addition, the station shifted through several morning shows. Due to US Radio's financing balloon bank note becoming due, Henry was forced to sell his 49-station empire, with KISF being bought by Metropolitan Radio Group in April 1996. Syncom bought the station in May 1997.

The station rebranded as "107.3 The X" on March 16, 1997, and took the new calls KCCX on June 25 of that year. Classic rock station KCFX nearly threatened to sue the station because the call letters were too similar. To remedy this, the call letters were changed to KNRX on March 1, 1998. During this time, the station started leaning towards the active rock route by playing harder-edged rock acts, in order to compete with KQRC. The station's airstaff included Kansas City-native Mancow Muller in morning drive, Jason Justice, "The Morning (and later on, Afternoon) Headrush" w/ Jay and Sammye, and Roach and Sumo (with The Fonz) hosting "The Midnight Moshpit", as well as carrying "Off the Beaten Track" featuring a freeform format on Friday (and later, Sunday) nights, "Resurrection Sunday" and the syndicated "Out of Order Countdown" with Jed the Fish on weekends.

Despite being Kansas City's only modern rock outlet (especially during a time when the format was very popular nationwide), the station's ratings were only modest during this time, usually in the mid 2 shares (12+), most likely because of the station's signal issues and poor management. By the fall of 1997, the station's ratings plummeted to 15th place with a 1.5 share (12+). Mancow's show would later be dropped in Fall of 1998.

Urban oldies as "K-107"
At 10:04 a.m. on January 5, 1999, without warning, KNRX dropped the modern rock format. Jason Justice played the final song on "The X", which was the acoustic version of "Plush" by Stone Temple Pilots and announced a live legal ID that ended in "Boom". The station then began stunting with a ticking clock and a loop of "1999" by Prince. (On the same day, rival KOZN dropped its modern AC format.) The following day at Noon, KNRX flipped formats to urban oldies as "K-107, The Rhythm & Soul of Kansas City". K-107's first song was "Celebration" by Kool and The Gang. The station also picked up Tom Joyner for morning drive. The station's ratings would begin to improve after the flip; in the summer of 1999, "K-107" would peak at a 3.6 share (12+).

KMJK

On February 1, 2001, the station's call letters changed to the current KMJK. During the summer of that year, the station moved towards an urban adult contemporary format with the new moniker "Majik 107.3". In October 2003, the station, along with Radio 2000-owned KCHZ, was purchased by Cumulus Media, and in the Summer of 2004, the station altered its moniker to "Magic 107.3". In 2008, the station changed its city of license to North Kansas City, Missouri. The station also had a construction permit to move its transmitter to a site near Levasy, Missouri.

In 2011, with Cumulus Media's acquisition of Citadel Media, Cumulus announced the station would be spun off and put into a trust called Volt Media, LLC in order to meet FCC mandates on ownership limitations, despite that Citadel does not own any stations in Kansas City. However, in October of the same year, Cumulus announced plans to reacquire the station.

Over the course of 2018, KMJK began dropping most of their classic soul and pre-1990s music from their playlist, and began adding more hip hop tracks, in order to better compete against KPRS. During the fall of 2019, the station also dropped the "Magic" moniker, rebranding to using just their frequency, and switching mostly from urban AC to urban contemporary.

Other uses of KMJK
KMJK was originally located in Phoenix, Arizona and owned by Mobley Broadcasting Inc.  The station was built in 1991 as a docket 80-90 station to specially provide service to the African American community.  The station was constructed by long time Phoenix area broadcaster, Arthur Mobley and his wife Vicki Wilson - Mobley with support from SYNCOM.   The station was moved after being purchased in December 2000. Like the current format, the Phoenix station of the same call letters, was also Urban Adult Contemporary and carried Tom Joyner in the morning.  KMJK Majik 107 (106.9) in Phoenix accepted the spelling of MaJiK as the original Arabic phonetic spelling of the word.  The Phoenix station provided a progressive urban radio format with music, news, features and talk. The Phoenix station was partially owned by Syncom.
In 1977, KMJK Magic 107 first went on the air from Lake Oswego, Oregon on 106.7 MHz (now KLTH, another set of call letters used by a Kansas City radio station (KZPT)). The station was owned by Communico Northwest Corp. (Frederic W. Constant and partners) with studios located in "Magic Manor" (the historic 1905 "Tug Master's House" at 107 Burnham Road). The Magic 107 format was an early version of what has evolved into AAA (Triple-A), Adult-Album-Alternative. Programmed by morning host Archer, the Progressive, Soft-Album Rock station developed a small but solid 18- to 34-year-old audience. KMJK enjoyed moderate, low-budget success while competing with then-KVAN 1480 AM (The Mono Maniacs) and dominant market leaders KINK and KGON. In 1979, after formally adopting dual city of license (Lake Oswego-Portland), Magic 107 was purchased by Harte-Hanks Southern Communications, Inc. and became The Magic FM. The format changed to Contemporary Hit Radio (CHR) with a semi-highbrow, semi-comedic air staff of successful, medium/major market programmers and veteran air personalities. The debut air staff included: Beau Rafferty (6–10a); John Shomby, Program Director (10a–Noon); Dave McKay (Noon–3p); Pat Clarke (3–6p); "Dancin'" Danny Wright (6–10p); Chaz Kelly (10p–2a); "Allen Wesley" Archer (2–6a). Archer, along with News Director John David Lloyd, transitioned to the new ownership and format along with Randy Scott and "Spacey" Dave Vincent.

References
BroadcastKC

External links
Official Magic 107.3 Website

Urban contemporary radio stations in the United States
MJK
Lafayette County, Missouri
Clay County, Missouri
Radio stations established in 1969
1969 establishments in Missouri
Cumulus Media radio stations